Chet Atkins Plays Back Home Hymns is the seventeenth studio album of instrumental gospel hymns by guitarist Chet Atkins.

Reception

Writing for Allmusic, critic Jason Ankeny wrote that the album is "simply too brief to stand as a definitive collection of the guitarist's spiritual recordings; his instrumental work is impeccable of course, but performances of favorites like "Amazing Grace," "Just a Closer Walk with Thee" and "The Old Rugged Cross" pass by too quickly to properly whet the listener's appetite."

Reissues
 Chet Atkins Plays Back Home Hymns was re-released by BMG in 1998.

Track listing

Side one
 "Take My Hand, Precious Lord" (Thomas A. Dorsey) – 2:43
 "Amazing Grace" (John Newton) – 2:36
 "Will the Circle Be Unbroken" (Traditional) – 2"07
 "In the Garden" (C. Austin Miles) – 2:31
 "When They Ring the Golden Bells" (Traditional) – 2:30
 "Just As I Am" (William B. Bradbury, Charlotte Elliott) – 1:43

Side two
 "Further Along" (Traditional) – 3:03
 "Just a Closer Walk with Thee" (Traditional) – 2:05
 "The Old Rugged Cross" (George Bennard) – 2:25
 "Lonesome Valley" (Carter) – 2:02
 "God Be With You" (Traditional) – 2:33
 "Were You There" (Traditional) – 2:11

Personnel
Chet Atkins – guitar

References

1962 albums
Chet Atkins albums
Albums produced by Anita Kerr
RCA Victor albums
Gospel albums by American artists